The mid central vowel (also known as schwa) is a type of vowel sound, used in some spoken languages.

The phonetician Jane Setter describes the pronunciation of the unrounded variant as follows: "a sound which can be produced by basically relaxing the articulators in the oral cavity and vocalising." To produce the rounded variant, all that needs to be done in addition to that is to round the lips.

The contrast is not very stable, and many speakers use an unrounded vowel in both cases.

Danish and Luxembourgish have a mid central vowel that is variably rounded. In other languages, the change in rounding is accompanied with the change in height and/or backness.

The symbol  is often used for any unstressed obscure vowel, regardless of its precise quality. For instance, the English vowel transcribed  is a central unrounded vowel that can be close-mid , mid  or open-mid , depending on the environment.

Mid central unrounded vowel
The mid central unrounded vowel is frequently written with the symbol . If greater precision is desired, the symbol for the close-mid central unrounded vowel may be used with a lowering diacritic, . Another possibility is using the symbol for the open-mid central unrounded vowel with a raising diacritic, .

Features

Occurrence
{| class="wikitable" style="clear: both;"
! colspan="2" | Language !! Word !! IPA !! Meaning !! Notes
|-
|Albanian
|
|një
|[ɲə]
|'one'
|
|-
| rowspan="2" | Afrikaans || Standard ||  || rowspan="2" |  || 'light' || Also described as open-mid . See Afrikaans phonology 
|-
See Afrikaans phonology
|-
| colspan="2" |Bhojpuri
|
|
|'to do'
|
|-
| rowspan="3" | Catalan || Balearic ||  ||  || 'dry' || Stressable schwa that corresponds to the open-mid  in Eastern dialects and the close-mid  in Western dialects. See Catalan phonology
|-
| Eastern || rowspan="2"|  || rowspan="2"|  || rowspan="2"| 'with' || rowspan="2"| Reduced vowel. The exact height, backness and rounding are variable. See Catalan phonology
|-
| Some Western accents
|-
|Chinese
|Hokkien|| || || 'snail' ||
|-
| Chuvash || || ăман ||  || 'worm' ||
|-
| Danish || Standard ||  ||  || 'mare' || Sometimes realized as rounded . See Danish phonology
|-
| Dutch || Standard ||  ||  || 'runner' || The backness varies between near-front and central, whereas the height varies between close-mid and open-mid. See Dutch phonology
|-
| rowspan="8" | English || Most dialects || Tina ||  || 'Tina' || Reduced vowel; varies in height between close-mid and open-mid. See English phonology
|-
Other South African varieties use a higher, more front and rounded vowel . See South African English phonology
|-
| Norfolk ||
|-
'Upper Crust RP' speakers pronounce a near-open vowel , but for some other speakers it may actually be open-mid . This vowel corresponds to rhotacized  in rhotic dialects.
|-
| Geordie || rowspan="4" | bust || rowspan="4" |  || rowspan="4" | 'bust' || Spoken by some middle class speakers, mostly female; other speakers use .
|-
| Indian || May be lower.
|-
|-
| Yorkshire || Middle class pronunciation. Other speakers use .
|-
| rowspan="2" | Galician
| rowspan="2" | Some dialects
| 
| 
| 'milk'
|-
| 
| 
| 'to die'
|-
| rowspan="2" | German || Standard || [[German orthography|Beschlag]] ||  || 'fitting' || See Standard German phonology
|-
See Standard German phonology
|-
| colspan="2" |Georgian
|დგას/dgas
|[dəɡas]
|1st person singular 'to stand'
|Phonetically inserted to break up consonant clusters. See Georgian phonology
|-
| colspan="2" |Kashmiri
|
|
|'how many'
|
|-
| colspan="2" | Kensiu || colspan="2" align="center" |  || 'to be bald' || Contrasts with a rhotacized close-mid .
|-
| colspan="2" | Khmer
|  
| 
| 'to transport'
| See Khmer phonology
|-
| rowspan="2" |Kurdish
|Sorani (Central)
| rowspan="2" |/şew
| rowspan="2" |
| rowspan="2" |'night'
| rowspan="2" |See Kurdish phonology
|-
|Palewani (Southern)
|-
| colspan="2" | Luxembourgish ||  ||  || 'thin' || More often realized as slightly rounded . See Luxembourgish phonology
|-
| rowspan="5" |Malay
|Standard Indonesian
|lelah
|[lə.lah]
|'tired'
| rowspan="2" |See Malay phonology
|-
|Standard Malaysian
|pengadil
|[pə.ŋä.dɪl]
|'referee'
|-
|Johor-Riau
| rowspan="2" |apa
| rowspan="2" |[ä.pə]
| rowspan="2" |'what'
|Common realization of /a/ at the end of words and before /h/. See Malay phonology
|-
|Terengganu
|Common realization of /a/ at the end of words and before /h/. See Terengganu Malay
|-
|Jakartan dialect
|datang
|[da.təŋ]
|'to come'
|Usually occurs around Jakarta. If the letter /a/ is located in the last syllable between consonants, the sound changes from [a] to [ə]. For the dialects in Sumatra in which the /a/ letter ([a]) in the last syllable changes to an [ə] sound, see Malay phonology.
|-
| Norwegian || Many dialects ||  ||  || 'the strongest' || Occurs only in unstressed syllables. The example word is from Urban East Norwegian. Some dialects (e.g. Trondheimsk) lack this sound. See Norwegian phonology
|-
| colspan="2" | Plautdietsch ||  ||  || 'means' || The example word is from the Canadian Old Colony variety, in which the vowel is somewhat fronted .
|-
|Portuguese
|Brazilian
|maçã
|
|'apple'
|Possible realization of final stressed /ɐ̃/. Also can be open-mid .
|-
| colspan="2" | Romanian ||  ||  || 'hairy' || See Romanian phonology
|-
| colspan="2" | Serbo-Croatian ||  ||  || 'garden' ||  is a possible phonetic realization of the syllabic trill  when it occurs between consonants. See Serbo-Croatian phonology
|-
| Swedish || Southern ||  ||  || 'mitten' || Corresponds to a slightly retracted front vowel  in Central Standard Swedish. See Swedish phonology
|-
|colspan="2"| Tyap ||  ||  || 'ɡood' ||
|-
| colspan="2" |Welsh
|mynydd
|[mənɪð]
|'mountain'
|See Welsh phonology
|}

Mid central rounded vowel

Languages may have a mid central rounded vowel''' (a rounded ), distinct from both the close-mid and open-mid vowels. However, since no language is known to distinguish all three, there is no separate IPA symbol for the mid vowel, and the symbol  for the close-mid central rounded vowel is generally used instead. If precision is desired, the lowering diacritic can be used: . This vowel can also be represented by adding the more rounded diacritic to the schwa symbol, or by combining the raising diacritic with the open-mid central rounded vowel symbol, although it is rare to use such symbols.

Features

Occurrence

See also
 Schwa

Notes

References

 
 
 
 
 
 
 
 
 
 
 
 
 
 
 
 
 
 
 
 
 
 
 
 
 
 
 

 
 
  A summary of the presentation can be found here.

External links
 

Mid vowels
Central vowels